The Zaber is a minor tributary of the River Neckar in Baden-Württemberg, Germany.  It is some 22 km in length and joins the Neckar from the west at Lauffen am Neckar. It has given its name to the Zabergäu, the area between the Heuchelberg and Stromberg hills.

Name 
The first mention is from the year 793 as Zabernahgouwe (Zabernachgau). Traditionally it is assumed that the name is derived from the Latin word Taberna ("restaurant", "street station"). It is assumed that the Roman settlement in today's Meimsheim bore this name (similar to the Alsatian place Zabern) and that with time the place name was transferred to the surroundings or to the river. This theory is supported by the fact that there was a traffic junction in Roman Meimsheim and that the place was possibly of administrative importance for the region.

The region known as the Zabergäu, the area between the Heuchelberg and Stromberg hills, takes its name from the Zaber.

Geography

Source 
The Zaber rises in the district of Heilbronn about two kilometres south-southwest of Zaberfeld on the northern slope of the forested Stromberg (landscape). 
It flows initially into a reservoir known as the Ehmetsklinge.  It subsequently flows in an easterly direction through Zaberfeld, Pfaffenhofen, Güglingen and Brackenheim before reaching the Neckar at Lauffen. The river is shallow and therefore not navigable.

Notes

References

Rivers of Baden-Württemberg
Rivers of Germany